The 2019–20 Coppa Italia (branded as the Coppa Italia Coca-Cola for sponsorship reasons during the final) was the 73rd edition of the national cup in Italian football.

Lazio were the defending champions having won their seventh title in May 2019 against Atalanta, but were eliminated by Napoli in the quarter-finals. Due to the COVID-19 pandemic in Italy, both the second legs of the semi-finals and the final itself were postponed to June.

Napoli won the competition by defeating Juventus 4–2 on penalties in the final after a goalless draw, winning their sixth title overall and first since 2014.

Participating teams

Serie A (20 teams)

Atalanta (round of 16)
Bologna
Brescia
Cagliari
Fiorentina
Genoa
Hellas Verona
Internazionale (round of 16)
Juventus (round of 16)
Lazio (round of 16)
Lecce
Milan (round of 16)
Napoli (round of 16)
Parma
Roma (round of 16)
Sampdoria
Sassuolo
SPAL
Torino (round of 16)
Udinese

Serie B (20 teams)

Ascoli
Benevento
Chievo
Cittadella
Cosenza
Cremonese
Crotone
Empoli
Frosinone
Juve Stabia
Livorno
Perugia
Pescara
Pisa
Pordenone
Salernitana
Spezia
Trapani
Venezia
Virtus Entella

Serie C (29 teams)

Alessandria
Arezzo
Carpi (second round)
Carrarese
Casertana
Catania
Catanzaro
Cavese
FeralpiSalò
Fermana
Francavilla
Imolese
Monopoli
Monza
Novara
Padova (second round)
Piacenza
Potenza
Pro Patria
Pro Vercelli
Ravenna
Reggina
Rende
Sambenedettese
Siena
Südtirol
Triestina
Vicenza
Viterbese Castrense

Serie D (9 teams)

Adriese
Fanfulla
Fasano
Lanusei
Mantova
Matelica
Ponsacco
Sanremese
Turris

Format and seeding
Teams entered the competition at various stages, as follows:
 First phase (one-legged fixtures)
 First round: 27 teams from Serie C and the nine Serie D teams started the tournament
 Second round: the eighteen winners from the previous round were joined by the twenty Serie B teams and two teams from Serie C
 Third round: the twenty winners from the second round met the twelve Serie A sides seeded 9–20
 Fourth round: the sixteen winners faced each other
 Second phase
 Round of 16 (one-legged): the eight fourth round winners were inserted into a bracket with the Serie A clubs seeded 1–8
 Quarter-finals (one-legged)
 Semi-finals (two-legged)
 Final (one-legged)

Round dates
The schedule of each round was announced by the organization in July 2019, but then modified in March 2020 as follows:

First stage

First round
A total of 36 teams from Serie C and Serie D competed in this round, eighteen of which advanced to the second round.

Second round
A total of forty teams from the first round and Serie B competed in the second round, twenty of which advanced to join twelve teams from Serie A in the third round.

Third round
A total of 32 teams from the second round and Serie A (clubs seeded 9–20) competed in the third round, sixteen of which advanced to the fourth round.

Fourth round
A total of sixteen teams from the third round competed in the fourth round, eight of which advanced to the round of 16.

Final stage

Bracket

Round of 16
The Round of 16 matches were played between clubs seeded 1–8 in 2018–19 Serie A and clubs advancing from the fourth round. For teams meeting from the same division, home field advantage was determined by a draw, not seed number. This rule also applied in the quarter-finals and semi-finals, although in the semi-finals, the draw only determined the home team in the second leg.
The Round of 16 matches were played on 9, 14, 15, and 16 January.

Quarter-finals
The quarter-final matches were played on 21, 22, 28, and 29 January. The results of the draw that determined the home team were published on 10 December 2019.

Semi-finals
The first legs of the semi-final matches were played on 12 and 13 February. The second leg matches were scheduled to be played on 4 and 5 March, but were postponed to 12 and 13 June due to the coronavirus pandemic in Italy.

First leg

Second leg

Final

Top goalscorers

Notes

References

Coppa Italia seasons
Coppa Italia
Italy
Coppa Italia